Émile Léon Fisseux (born 15 February 1868 in Paris, date of death unknown) was a French competitor in the sport of archery.  Fisseux competed in one event in Archery at the 1900 Summer Olympics, taking third place in the 50 metre Au Cordon Doré competition.  His score of 28 points was one point behind the second-place archer, Hubert Van Innis, and three points behind the winner, Henri Hérouin.  While Fisseux received no medal at the time, he is currently considered to be a bronze medallist by the International Olympic Committee.

Fisseux also competed in Archery at the 1908 Summer Olympics, taking 13th place in the Continental style event with 185 points.

Notes

References
 International Olympic Committee medal winners database

External links
 

1868 births
Year of death missing
Archers at the 1900 Summer Olympics
Archers at the 1908 Summer Olympics
Olympic archers of France
French male archers
Olympic bronze medalists for France
Olympic medalists in archery
Medalists at the 1900 Summer Olympics
Place of death missing
Sportspeople from Paris